The Renault Racoon is a concept car created by Renault, was first shown in 1992.

The Racoon used a twin-turbocharged V6 engine of 2963 cc, a six-speed manual transmission and an all wheel drive system. It produced 193 kW (262 bhp) of power at 6.000 r.p.m. and 363 Nm (37 mkg) of torque at 2.500 r.p.m.

Overview
To enter the Racoon, the driver had to open a canopy door. The car had seating space for three passengers and had much luggage space. The vehicle was also aquatic-capable. The Racoon could be raised upwards to provide additional ground clearance. The construction of its suspension meant this was achieved with a levered effect.

The car also had many radical features such as rain-diffusing glass, remote controlled entry, computer control, satellite navigation and cameras as opposed to rear view mirrors. While these technologies have become much more affordable and reliable, at the time of its launch most of this technology was still in its infancy.

The Renault Racoon's industrial designer was Patrick Le Quément.

References

External links
Renault Racoon shown on the Discovery Channel

Renault concept vehicles